Operation Garzón is the name given to the arrest of 45 Catalan nationalists and the search of the headquarters of Catalan newspapers and pro-independence organizations in 1992, prior to the 1992 Summer Olympics held in Barcelona, Catalonia's capital city. Over 30 people were arrested between 29 June and 14 July 1992, including two journalists, the mayor of Ribera d'Urgellet and activists in the Catalan independence movement, and more were arrested some days later. The arrested were claimed to be members of the armed Catalan pro-independence organisation Terra Lliure, often with no real proof besides their involvement in the pro-independence movement. Even though Terra Lliure had already announced its dissolution the previous year, the Operation was carried out under the official reason of preventing a possible attack during the 1992 Summer Olympics. However, those who were arrested believe it was done to scare Catalan independentists from using the widely followed event as a platform for their political movement. The operation is named after the Spanish judge Baltasar Garzón, who was its main director.

In 1995, 25 of the detainees were tried and, of these, 18 were convicted of belonging to Terra Lliure using the confession many of them had allegedly been forced to memorize during torture, when the police threatened them and their families if they did not declare this. 17 of the detainees alleged that they had been tortured, but judge Baltazar Garzón refused to investigate it despite the bruises in the detainees' bodies. This ended up in the European Court of Human Rights in 2004 which condemned the Spanish State for refusing to investigate the torture allegations.

Torture testimony 
Judge Baltazar Garzón ordered that 25 of the arrested be kept in solitary confinement. 17 out of these 25 denounced suffering torture at the hands of the Spanish police as well as threats of violence and rape to them and their families, Catalanophobic insults, and at least one of them reached the point of attempting suicide.

Below are the testimonies given in July 1992, after being released, by those who denounced having been tortured.

Marcel Dalmau i Brunet 
The threats, torture and harassment of all kinds were inflicted on me at the 'Directorate General of the Civil Guard' in Madrid. In the Girona barracks, despite the climate of intimidation that reigned there, I was treated with a certain correctness.

I entered the 'Dirección General' on Sunday 5th of July in the early morning. They took me out to the hospital the next morning. The torture sessions they subjected me to basically consisted of making me spend hours and hours on my knees on the floor where there were some kind of splinters that stuck into my flesh. As a result, the skin was torn from my knees. They placed my hands behind my back and a plastic bag over my head that one or two torturers tightened around my neck causing me to suffocate in agony. Meanwhile, other torturers, from five to eight, beat me hard all over my body (in the head, stomach, testicles...). They were kicks, punches and also hits with objects, with a book. In other words, while they were suffocating me with the plastic bag, I received a veritable barrage of blows and screams. Among the shouts were constant insults against Catalonia and Catalans with a racist and sexist content. During the torture my head was covered in sweat. Sometimes they would blow smoke into my bag before tightening it, they would also burn the inside end of the bag with a cigarette so that it would suck the smoke from the burning plastic. This torture was repeatedly inflicted on me over endless sessions.

The very terror caused by feeling the officers enjoying suffocating you and beating you is part of this torture. They also forced me to put an electric wire with three ends on my testicles. They spent a very long time intimidating me and saying sadistic things about sexual topics to me. During this torture the vexations of all kinds and the terror were endless, allow me to spare myself from describing it in more detail because when I remember it the effects of this terrible experience are reproduced for me.

Between sessions, when they stopped to rest, they locked me in a cell. These intervals never exceeded twenty minutes.

After the last torture session before I tried to commit suicide I was told that Carme, my partner, was also being held and was being taken to Madrid, and that I would be able to hear her screams in 'stereo sound' when she got tortured as they had done to me. Even though I had been devastated for hours, this left me absolutely shattered. With everything they had done to me and were doing to me, I had no doubt about the veracity of their intentions.

After a short time of being in the cell, owing to the state in which I found myself, and with an immediate prospect even more horrible and monstrous, I was driven to suicide. Never in my life had I thought of killing myself, but here it presented itself to me as a necessity (I couldn't take it anymore) and as a response to so much cruelty and vexation. Since I had nothing to kill myself with, I threw myself headlong against the wall. I was left laying motionless on the ground, my head spinning. I was semi-unconscious. Then a handful of very nervous civil guards entered. One of them kicked me repeatedly, his colleagues stopped him. I couldn't move. They were very uneasy, they didn't know what to do. I lost consciousness. They took me to a hospital. The officers who guarded me there behaved properly. I was very disoriented. I was thinking about Carme, but none of the guards knew or wanted to tell me anything about her. In the hospital I had a sudden visit from an individual who uttered threats against me and my family if I dared to speak about the tortures, while reminding me that I already knew 'what' I had to testify. And that if I didn't say what they wanted me to say, everything that had happened would be nothing compared to what would happen to me, to Carme and to my family.

Well into the evening, half a dozen civil guards showed up in the hospital room, where there were already two other ones with a typewriter and a public defender who practically didn't pay attention to me. They took my statement from my bed, and the next morning, when I still felt numb and dizzy and I had serious difficulties moving, they took me to testify in the National Court. During the journey I asked about Carme but no one gave me any kind of explanation. I assumed the worst. I linked her fate to the threats I had received at the hospital.

Finally, and due to the repeated and persistent threats I received by officials of the Spanish state, I hold the Spanish Minister of the Interior and the 'Directorate General of the Civil Guard' responsible for any damage or aggression that may be received by my wife, any member of my family or myself.

Xavier Ros 
Members of the Civil Guard arrested me on July 7th around 8:30 p.m. when I was leaving home. They took me to Girona. During the journey they hit my face and the back of my neck while asking me questions. In Girona, in the barracks they made me get naked, they made me face the wall and they beat me. They made me fall and on the ground they continued beating me. The next day, early in the morning, they started insulting me, put me in a cell, cover me with a blanket to prevent the hits from leaving signs, they made me kneel and hit me on the head, the back of the neck, back, stomach and legs much more intensely than the day before. They ask me about a "zulo" [Spanish word for a subterranean hiding place]. To stop the all that hitting I told them that I will take them to a place in the mountains. They dug for a few hours and nothing came up. They threatened to kill me with a gun. We return to Girona and they spent the journey beating me. The same day they take me to Madrid, we arrived in the early morning. After breakfast they put me in a cell facing the wall. Another session of questioning and punching all morning long. In the afternoon they put a plastic bag over my head twice to cause suffocation. They hit me repeatedly with some sort of plastic club on my back, head and neck.

They made me stand up in the cell for a few hours, due to fatigue I fell asleep and as punishment for falling asleep they beat me with a baton on the back for a long time.

The next day, they repeated all the aforementioned tortures. They make me do push-ups and threaten to apply the "machine". All this with shouts and personal insults against me and against Catalonia, and with threats against my family.

During the interrogation they told me what I had to testify. They made me memorize the answer they had chosen and made me repeat it several times. They told me that if I didn't answer what they told me, they would keep torturing me.

At the National Court, before testifying before the judge, I was allowed to speak with the lawyer. The lawyer told me to sign everything the Civil Guard had made me say through torture. He assured me that the judge had told him that by signing that statement he would release me on bail, which he did.

Xavier Ros, July 29th, 1992

Xavier Puigdemont 
I was taken at around six in the afternoon on July 7th at my workplace. They took me to the barracks in Girona. They insulted me and slapped me a few times, but nothing serious.

They took me to Madrid. We arrived in the early morning. During the interrogations they covered my eyes with a kind of plastic tape. They made me stand up against the wall and asked me questions while they beat me all over my body.

They threatened me with the application of electrodes. They called this torture "the machine". I told them I have asthma, but they laughed. They told me that the forensic doctor had told them that I could withstand 3600 W and that if I could not withstand it, it was not their fault, but the forensic doctor's fault for not advising them well enough. Their comments were of great sadistic cynicism. I was terrified. They made me hold some kind of objects in my hands, like rods. I can't say it any better because I was still blindfolded. While I held those objects in my hands, they argued about whether or not to lower the lever. I was terrified. They wanted me to understand that they were discussing the possibility of electrocuting me.

They threatened me to use the bathtub [torture method]. They were already taking me to torture me but suddenly the "good" officer appeared and stopped them. They made me hear the voices of my fellow detainees.

They put the plastic bag over my head twice. The second time they squeezed it very tightly while hitting me continuously all over my body.

During the days that I was arrest I did not eat or sleep. I lost seven kilos. I had never felt so much terror in my life. During the statement I signed everything that they told me to sign because of the fear that the tortures would be repeated. They told me that since I had a clean record I didn't have to worry, that if I signed I could get out.

Xavier Puigdemont, Girona, July 29, 1992

Xavier Alemany 
They took me in l'Estartit at 5 o'clock in the afternoon on the 7th of July. They took me to the barracks of the Civil Guard in l'Estartit. Officers beat me up while asking me about a cache of weapons. They put a kind of balaclava that covered my eyes. After a while they took me to Girona. During the trip they threatened to stop the car and "make me learn the lesson". In Girona, at the barracks, I was not physically assaulted.

In Madrid, in the early morning, shortly after arriving, I asked to go to the bathroom, they took me there and once inside they wouldn't let me urinate. They made me do push-ups for a long time in the middle of excrement and urine. In the morning was the first interrogation, they told me that I had to admit everything they were saying. I refused because it was a lie. They were hitting me on the back, head, neck and legs. The session lasted all morning. They threatened to electrocute me. In the afternoon, they put a plastic bag over my head twice. They threw cigarette smoke into the plastic bag to increase the feeling of asphyxiation. The first time they put the bag on me I was about to faint.

The next day I was hit with an object that looked like a rolled-up, tube-shaped telephone book. They made me kneel, they placed my toes in such a way that I could not rest the weight of my body on my feet, but that everything fell on my knees. While I was on my knees they beat me for a long time all over my body. The insults, the threats, the coercions were repeated over and over again.

The next day I signed the statement. The Civil Guard forced me to repeat what they had decided I should say under threat of further torture.

Xavier Alemany, Girona, July 29, 1992

Eduard Lòpez 
I was arrested on Monday the 6th of July - approximately at 11:30 pm - and taken blindfolded to a Civil Guard barracks whose location I would never get to know. At the time of the arrest, carried out at the portal of my home when I went downstairs claimed by the intercom to see a supposed "friend from Vic", they threw a jacket over my head, put me in a car and did not reveal the reasons for my arrest - they told me [in Spanish] "You know what we're here for, right?"-. Only when I arrived at the interrogation room I was informed that I was under arrest for my alleged relationship with Terra Lliure and my rights are revoked. I signed a document to that effect.

On the first night of interrogation I received the first slaps on the back of my head and some occasional kicks. They make me stand up the whole time, blindfolded and facing the wall. Until the morning arrived - I identified it by the sound of birds - I was not allowed to sit down.

I began to hear the roar of guards getting to work. The interrogations got tougher. The hitting increased. I identified a person as the most responsible for my interrogation. When he wants, he speaks in Catalan -with a strong Spanish accent - although he prohibits me from using the Catalan language, [saying] "Here there are people who do not understand it". He himself is in charge of punching me in the kidneys and inciting me to "confess" when they start applying what they call the "thinking machine" - a plastic bag placed on the head that prevents breathing and ends up causing suffocation.

They threaten me with "the bathtub" and with putting my head in a toilet bowl. During my stay in Barcelona they did not allow me to sleep or give me anything to eat. Sporadically - "if I behave" - ​​they let me drink a glass of water. They took me to the bathroom twice: the first time on Tuesday morning and the second time in the afternoon, just before I was transferred to Madrid.

The transfer to Madrid took place in a van. During the whole trip I was handcuffed and blindfolded. It seems to me - I couldn't say for sure - that we are three detainees who are being transferred. The van picked up a lot of speed and I was even afraid it might cause an accident.

We arrived in Madrid. They left me in a cell without light and with a bunk with two blankets. I was hearing terrifying screams coming from upstairs. They immediately took me in for questioning. A real torment started then. They put a plastic bag over my head and, as I was suffocating, I teared it off with some violence. Enraged, they handcuffed my hands behind my back and continued applying the bag to me. They made me get on my knees - one of them sitting on top of me - with more bags on my head and continuously hitting me on the head. They kicked and punched me. I struggled and managed to sit up minimally several times. They threatened to apply electricity to me if I didn't "cooperate" and at the same time one of them was running his fingers over my arms. I don't know how long the session lasted. I identified the guard who can speak Catalan as the leader. He was the one who gave the order to let me sit in a chair and asked me if I wanted a glass of water. When they went down to the cell again, they make me stand up straight facing the wall. I was very sleepy and I felt I was about to faint. From time to time the guards would open the bars of the cell door to check that I had not fallen into the temptation of lying on the bunk.

The rest of the interrogations - carried out by the one who could speak Catalan accompanied by a younger boy - were a constant "reviewing for the exam" based on the falsehoods they make me say in this first interrogation. They intimidated me with the noise produced by plastic bags and continued, although not with such an intensity, kicking my head.

A few hours after the first interrogation, I was taken to a room where a woman identified herself with a card from the Colegio de Forenses de Madrid [Madrid School of Forensic Doctors]. They had previously removed the blindfold from my eyes. She asked me if I'm on medication, if I have contagious diseases, etc. She checked me and saw that I had an injury on my knee. She took note of it, but, although I denied that my arrest was violent, she did not ask me how the injury occurred. When she asked me what kind of treatment I am receiving from the Civil Guard, I shrugged and looked her in the eyes. She lowered hers. As a farewell, she recommended me that, despite the bad situation, I should not stop eating. According to her, I needed it.

Shortly after, "dinner" arrived. It was the first thing I could eat since I was arrested. From then on, the food issue will become more normal.

Thursday morning, a guard entered the cell and made me sign a paper from the judge according to which my solitary confinement is extended for another 48 more hours.

My interrogators warn me that they will soon bring me up to talk to "some of their friends". They seem to be referring to my future police statement. The one who can speak Catalan no longer attended the last interrogation. It was done by the younger one.

In the early morning from Thursday to Friday they brought me up to testify. We took a different path than the one that leads to the room where they usually interrogate me. I find a clerk, a plainclothes guard who asks me questions and, sitting to my left, a woman who doesn't say anything. When I asked who she was, the guard showed me a card that identifies her as a lawyer at the Colegio de Madrid.

They told me if I wanted to testify. I didn't know what to do and I was scared. I answered yes. As I declared, I was hearing groans coming from a nearby room. The lawyer didn't say a word. The one asking the questions stood up and opened the door to the corridor, saying it's very hot and he wants some air... After a while they call him outside, he leaves and when he comes back he asks me a new question. I ended up stating essentially what my two "instructors" demanded of me.

The next day they took me to the Court. Around noon I went to the judge's office. He asked me the questions based on my police statement. I denied the most patently false part and, although I would have liked to clarify some other aspect of my statement, I didn't want to look like a liar and "punk" in front of the judge. I felt very intimidated by him. I reported the tortures I had been subjected to and he took note of them. Previously, when I was in the Court's cell, a coroner took note of my knee injury and I explained its origin.

Barcelona, July 13th, 1992

Vicent Conca 
My name is Vicent Conca i Ferràs, I have been a member of the MDT for years. Last July 1st, 1992, I was arrested around 8pm at the MDT headquarters in Barcelona. I was arrested by the Civil Guard, who transferred me to one of their headquarters in Barcelona or nearby. I can't tell which one it was because I was blindfolded or my eyes were bandaged. The next day they drove me to Madrid, but I don't know exactly where. We remained in this place until our statement before the judge of the National Court.

During the entire period of detention, almost four days, I was incommunicado and had no possibility to contact any family member or lawyer. This allowed the Civil Guard to act with impunity and subject me to all kinds of torture, threats, pressure and humiliation.

I will now detail these facts so that everyone is aware of them:

I was constantly interrogated for almost three days. During these interrogations I could not see who was torturing me because my eyes were always covered with a blindfold or with my hands. During these sessions I could hear the screams of my comrades, who were being tortured in adjoining rooms.

They hit me with their hands on my head, neck and back (the upper part). This hitting was constant during the interrogations and only ended when I testified before the Civil Guard. The officers who beat me could be one or, as often happened, three or four at a time.

For one day (the first of my arrest) I did not sleep nor eat. Another night, the third, I was continuously woken up, forced to stand up or do push-ups. The second night I slept for only a few hours, but during that time they did not disturb my sleep. Only on the fourth night, from Saturday to Sunday, was I left alone, since I had declared what they wanted.

In the intervals between interrogations, they forced me to stand on my feet and sometimes to do push-ups. All this prevented me from being able to rest during the day.

They applied the bag method to me numerous times to induce suffocation. The bags, probably garbage bags, covered my head and the upper part of my body; only on one occasion did they make use of a bag that practically covered my entire body. This system of torture was accompanied by hitting my neck, head and also, although less often, hitting my stomach.

On three occasions they submerged my whole head in water in order to drown me. I couldn't see where the water was because my eyes were covered. They called this method "the bathtub".

They put a revolver against my head and in my mouth several times, threatening to kill me if I didn't answer what they wanted. They also threatened to take me to a mountain and kill me there. They assured that this had already happened many times and no one had found out.

Other types of threats were to torture and sexually assault my girlfriend, who they claimed was also under arrest; to further torture my arrested comrades; and to make me swallow water through a tube until I drowned.

Before the statement before the Civil Guard, made on Saturday the 4th in the afternoon, they warned me that if I did not answer what they had told me or if I did not sign the statement, they would torture me again and repeat the process as many times as necessary. I want to mention the fact that the public defender before whom I testified that day and with whom I could not speak stated two or three times that I looked bad. Even so, I want to point out the relative indifference of the two public defenders who assisted me, one in the statement and the other in the photo identification.

On Sunday morning, a civil guard told us from the corridor of the cells that if we reported being tortured we would one day find ourselves on the street and some accident might happen to us.

The insults (markedly sexist, in many cases) against me, my girlfriend, my ideology, the Catalan people and their symbols were constant throughout the period of my detention. On the other hand, I was forced to shout slogans like "Viva España" [long live Spain], "Viva la Guàrdia Civil" [long live the Civil Guard] or to count out loud up to a hundred in Spanish.

To end this list, I would like to point out the interest shown by the Civil Guard in arresting and, above all, in torturing Carles Castellanos. The officers constantly and repeatedly alluded to him.

I want to insist on the fact that the physical torture practically stopped once I had made the police statement, on Saturday the 4th in the afternoon, that is, once they had obtained a self-incriminating statement. From this moment on, the abuse was reduced to threats, insults and harassment.

For all these reasons, the statement I made before the Civil Guard has no validity and I only ratify the one I made at the National Court. A State that systematically needs torture to eliminate those it considers its political enemies cannot be considered democratic.

Alcalá-Meco prison, July 14th, 1992

Jaume Oliveras 
I was arrested by two people, one of them pointing a gun at me, at half past six in the afternoon on Wednesday, July 1st, 1992, when I was leaving the Ronda de Sant Pere premises; they made me get into a car, later identifying themselves as members of the Civil Guard and telling me that I was under the anti-terrorist law for being accused of belonging to Terra Lliure.

During the journey to the Civil Guard barracks, I was continuously being hit on the head; having to keep my eyes closed with my head between my knees, with my hands cuffed. I spent a long time in a room; I immediately exposed my breathing problems as I suffer from asthma.

Then they took me to another room where the interrogations began. They brought me the two sprays I need for asthma; but previously they were emptying them, because I heard the noise. I was always made to wear a hood and a piece of garbage bag taped over my eyes, and my hands cuffed. In Barcelona I was threatened with the bathtub several times.

In the morning they put me in a car and took me to Madrid, all the journey in handcuffs and with my head and eyes covered. I think that, approximately around midday, I arrived at the Madrid barracks and spent there the night of Thursday, Friday and Saturday.

In Madrid, the abuse and threats were non-stop. As soon as I arrived, the numerous interrogations began and from time to time they locked me in a cell. They didn't let me lie down for a relatively long bit until Saturday morning, and I was almost always standing with my eyes closed. I was constantly being transferred from the cell to different rooms where I was interrogated.

Apart from this fatigue and psychological pressure, I was constantly hit on the head, back of the neck, shoulders and back. Despite the fact that when I was in the cell and I asked for it, they gave me asthma medication; it didn't help me since they did the "bag" to me several times. Tying one or two bags at a time leaving me breathless and on one of the occasions introducing tobacco smoke inside.

On several occasions they were about to do the bathtub to me, only going so far as to throw water over me. One night I was also threatened with electrodes, walking them over my face showing me a chair with wheels where they would tie me with a bag over my head to start beating me. Psychologically I was shattered, feeling vegetative. They threatened me that if I didn't say what they wanted, it wouldn't cost them anything to throw me in the Masnou harbour to drown me. They also threatened and insulted my partner, threatening me with her arrest and wanting to implicate her.

They expressed their special interest in torturing Carles Castellanos; making me repeat that I was his right hand man. The two police statements I had to give and sign were a complete farce. Before doing them, they made me rehearse them four or five times and if I didn't do it as well as they wanted, they would take me down again to question me.

The first statement was on Saturday afternoon and before I made it I was told that I had an extension of 24 hours of incommunicado; therefore I had to go back down to the cell. On Sunday morning I made the second statement, having to go back to the cell before being transferred to the Court. Some of the questions in the police statement were already being answered by the interrogator himself; the public defender showed total disinterest in the case and in the declarations that the Civil Guard forced me to sign. Finally, once in the Court, I stated to the forensic that I had received these abuses and threats.

Alcalá-Meco prison, July 14th, 1992

Ramon Lòpez 
My name is Ramon Lòpez i Iglésias and I have been a pro-independence activist for years. Next, I will describe my passage through the basements of the Civil Guard headquarters, in Barcelona and Madrid, from my arrest in Barcelona until the statement before the judge of the National Court of Madrid, with the intention of making the public opinion in general know about the practice of TORTURE done by the state's security forces and for the appropriate investigations to be carried out, should the case arise.

My arrest took place on Wednesday, July 1st, 1992, some time before 8pm. At that moment I was together with other comrades, inside the headquarters of the MDT in Barcelona, ​​on Carrer Sant Pere més Baix. A group of members of the Civil Guard in plainclothes, accompanied by a judge and a secretary, entered the building and prepared to search the premises, at the same time as they demanded to see the documents of all the people who were inside.

At the moment of identifying me, they took me by the arm to the exit door where another person informed me of my arrest, while another one handcuffed me, and three or four of them took me, downwards, to a car. They had applied the anti-terrorist law to me, so I was held in solitary confinement without the right to a lawyer for four days.

It was from that moment that the abuse began. During the entire journey to the headquarters of the Civil Guard in Barcelona (Plana Major, 2¦ section, 4¦ region), once they had covered my head with a plastic bag, they did not stop hitting me in the face, on the head and in the stomach, at the same time uttering threats and insults against me and my family.

The interrogations in Barcelona lasted all night. They basically consisted of strong blows to my back, face, stomach and genitals. I was subjected to the torture method called "the bag", which consists of covering my head up to the neck with a black plastic garbage bag, and squeezing it hard produces after a short time the distressing feeling of suffocation.

At the same time as they were "bagging" me, they were hitting me on the head with a thick book and/or a telephone directory, which at first produced a feeling of momentary loss of consciousness while remaining kneeling on the floor. In addition, the threats and insults were constant. One of the threats consisted of telling me that they would throw me down a ravine after killing me, at the same time that they were touching my temple with a metal object that could simulate or be a gun.

All of this, summarized, is what they did to me until the morning of July 2nd before I made the trip by car to the headquarters of the Civil Guard in Madrid.

I was blindfolded for the entire trip and was not given anything to eat, just like the whole night before. Once in Madrid, starting from the very moment I arrived, the interrogations did not cease to occur, only with the interval of time between the interrogation of one of my comrades and mine, even though they often did up to three at a time. In all this time, from the arrival on July 2nd until the statement at the National Court, on July 5th, the torture, threats and humiliations were constant. The cell, located in the basements of the building, was completely dark and the stench made the air unbreathable, later, when they opened the door and before covering my eyes, I saw remains of human excrement in a side of the cell.

The methods of torture were both physical and psychological. In addition to the blows all over the body, but especially on the head and the application of "the bag" throughout the interrogations, the threats were of sexual assault against my partner, against my family and insults against Catalans. Threats of killing me and of subjecting me to other methods of torture, while they showed me, not visually but by physical contact, what they called "the bathtub", which consisted of putting my head underwater until I felt suffocation and asphyxiation, and the application of what they called the "talking machine", which was nothing more than electric discharges through the application of electrodes, clamps on the genitals or other parts of the body.

The whole time, I was blindfolded, the darkness was a factor of great tension, I did not know where I was, I could not see anyone or where the blows were coming from. During the interrogations there were those who talked more and asked questions and those who beat and/or tortured me, but there were times when they all began to hit me and shout loudly, threatening and insulting me.

In one of the sessions, they had me kneeling on the ground and handcuffed behind my back and with the bag tight on my head, while others stomped on my feet and kept hitting me on the head and face. At that moment, when it became impossible for me to resist for any longer, I had a kind of nervous breakdown, after which I was lying on the ground with them holding my feet and shoulders while an officer let the weight of his foot fall on my face.

On other occasions, they let me hear how they were torturing the other comrades, hearing screams and blows, and they asked me if I recognized the screams of my girlfriend who was being tortured, that it was up to me to whether they would stop doing it, this was accompanied by the details of everything types of sexual assaults that were doing to her.

During the entire time of my detention I could not sit or change my clothes, and only from the third day was I given food.

On other occasions I was forced to shout slogans like "Viva la Guardia Civil" [long live the Civil Guard] and other similar ones and against the Catalan people.

On Saturday July 4th, before I went up to testify before the Civil Guard, they threatened me, telling me that if I didn't testify what they wanted, they would annul the statement and torture me again until I testified the way they wanted. On Sunday the 5th, the same day as the statement at the National Court, before I left the Civil Guard headquarters, I received another threat, if I did not ratify my statement and if I reported torture and ill-treatment before the judge, they would arrest the my girlfriend and include her in the case. They repeated this threat again in the basement of the National Court, before leaving me in the hands of the Police.

This whole statement is a summary of everything I had to go through and suffer during my detention. I'm sure I'm leaving out details that my memory doesn't want to remember again, but I can assure you that at no point did I want to dramatize anything in my statement, rather the opposite, since it's difficult to express in words the feelings, the pain, the cruelty, degradation and suffering.

Any State or government that calls itself democratic and legal that needs and uses TORTURE as a systematic practice and as a political instrument is a corrupt and rotten State. A state no ethical or legal legitimation of any kind.

Ramon Lòpez i Iglesias, Alcalá-Meco prison, July 15th, 1992

Josep Poveda 
During the days that I was in the hands of the Civil Guard (first in Barcelona, ​​and then in Madrid), from the moment of my arrest at eight o'clock in the evening on July 6th and until noon on July 8th that I went to the National Court, I was the subject of torture and ill-treatment that I report as I did at the time. I will detail them below:

From the moment of my arrest at my home I was forced to not see any light and had my eyes blindfolded tied with bands and adhesive tape and also with a hood.

I was constantly punched all over my face and body with "telephone directories" and iron bars wrapped in newspapers. These abuses left me practically no sign except for on my nose, forearm and neck.

During the night from Monday to Tuesday they forced me to stay awake and I continuously received, throughout the whole of Tuesday, threats of torture that - according to them - would be applied to me immediately (the "bathtub", the "machine"...). The transfer, on Tuesday afternoon, to Madrid was in a van and with the obligation to remain motionless throughout the journey, under the threat that if I moved they would leave me unconscious.

In Madrid, in the cells of the Civil Guard, I was subjected to the application of the so-called "bag" which was applied to me several times throughout that long night from Tuesday to Wednesday. The attempt to asphyxiate me with that bag was constant, also the obligation to remain standing all night was another of the abuses I received.

Psychologically, I can also explain that I was threatened that they would torture my friends present there, comrades and family members... if I did not declare exactly what they wanted to me to declare.

On a side note, I feel obliged to mention the interest, almost obsessive, that the Civil Guard had in Carles Castellanos and Llorenç, to abuse him and torture him in all kinds of ways and to have him there. It is in this sense that I mention this fact, all the while alerting the public opinion in general of the systematic hatred that the Civil Guard can manufacture against any movement or person related to the fight for freedoms.

Alcalá-Meco prison, July 14th, 1992

Esteve Comellas 
My arrest took place at my home, with what looked like an arrest warrant (they wouldn't let me read it) and the presence of a clerk from the Manresa court. They read me my rights, which included the presence of a lawyer if I was to make any kind of statement, which I asked for and I was denied because they said a special legislation was being applied to me which didn't allow it. They then began to search the apartment, starting with the room where I was sleeping, where my partner was. They told me that if there was something in the flat I should say it, they threatened her and insulted her. They started emptying cupboards in a disorganized way and punched me a couple of times and asked me questions about people and places I didn't know.

In the presence of my wife, clearly emotionally affected by what was happening, and seeing her questions about what was happening, they took me down to the street where they handcuffed me and wrapped my head in a jean jacket while putting me in a car, making me lie in the back on the ground and squeezing my neck all the time, always with my head down. The journey to the Manresa Civil Guard [headquarters] took a short time, where I was taken to a room where there were three or four people who continued asking me questions about people and places, hit me on the head and applied the plastic bag intermittently, making it difficult for me to breathe, and accompanied by punches to the stomach.

When I said that I had seen a woman the night before around my neighbourhood who I thought was a civil guard, she, who was there, kicked me in the testicles. She insulted me because of this fact. They applied the bag to my head repeatedly and kept hitting me and telling me that they knew everything and that they had also taken my partner away first. This affected me a lot and they realized it, because from that moment on it was a constant threat and they were saying that she was explaining everything and that other people had also implicated her. This lasted for about an hour, then and always with my head hit or covered by the jean jacket, they put me in a dark cell from which I could hear different civil guards spying on me through a grate and insulting me with words of "son of a bitch", "terrorist", "you have to kill him". After a while they opened my cell and with my head covered and after passing through a few corridors they put me in a car with my head almost touching the ground. During an unknown journey that lasted about an hour, they kept asking me, insulting and threatening my partner, with blows to my shoulder and my head.

I don't know where they took me, but I remember getting out of the car and, with my head still covered by the jean jacket, we arrived at some bathroom (well, a sink and a toilet) where they made me sit down, threatening me not to turn my head (when they thought I was doing it, there was someone who hit me on the head). They started repeating names and dates unknown to me, saying I had some floppy disks at home, asking where did I have lists of people, etc. Since I did not know what they were talking about, they applied the bag to my head three or four times while telling me to remember, and warning me that they would put my head in the toilet, that they had arrested my partner and that they would put her through a bad time and they would accuse her of a bunch of things I didn't know about.

From time to time, for about ten minutes, they left me alone until the "voice" came back, I say "voice" because there was a very hard one and another soft one that said recommendations. I couldn't make things up, I told them, and they provided me with data, places and people that I was memorizing and repeating.

The strong pressure, once the beatings and asphyxiations with the bag stopped, was the situation of my partner. I did not know how she was except for what the agents told me and with disparate answers when I was asked new unknown questions. As I remember, it was Monday but I don't know the time or if it was day or night. They made me repeat a statement with new additions of people and facts like 10 or 15 times.

They moved me towards the late evening to a room with various material, from time to time the one who asked me about facts and people showed up. He would tell me that I was a loser and that everyone else (he said 16 or 17 people) had said everything. In the evening I was taken to another room, always facing the wall and repeating a statement I has already memorized by heart.

At night, in a stock car, handcuffed and head down, we went on a journey that lasted until daylight, I understood that we were going to Madrid. There, right when we got out of the car, I was taken (always with my head covered) to a cell one and a half meters wide by three long without a light bulb.

With interference, technically of 2 hours, they opened the cell's door and made me turn my back against the wall and told me to put on a mask that they gave me to covered my eyes and they took me to a room where they sat in a corner and the questions started again. Then, on the third or fourth time, they made me explain the facts to them, correcting me when I made a mistake. Sometimes it was the early hours of the morning, and always at the end it was repeating the same thing. Days pass, which I knew because of meals, until in front of a public defender I declare what I had memorized.

Regarding my partner, Teresa Mas, in Barcelona a few hours before being put into the car that was to take me to Madrid, they let me see her and say a few words to her, and they told me immediately after that that if I didn't remember more things they would take her too. This affected me a lot. In Madrid, they threatened me telling me to behave well at the time of the statement and that if I did so they would let her go free. In order to force me to do that they let me see her through the bars without being able to exchange a word. At the time of declaring to the instructor, he told me that she was free but I did not believe it.

I remember those five days as suffering and psychological breakdown because of what they were doing to her. They knew how to use it to make me recite what they wanted.

Joan Rocamora 
I was arrested, on the 28th at approximately 11:30, violently by a group of individuals (about a dozen) unknown to me, as far as I can remember, in civilian clothes. They threw themselves on top of me when I was riding my motorbike, quickly and avoiding the curiosity of passers-bys they handcuffed me and put a fabric sack on my head. Afterwards, they took me to the car, where the absolute darkness began, which would last until the end of five days.

First they tried to asphyxiate me with the sack and threatened to throw me into the Llobregat river. They stopped the car(s) and took me to a sort of open field not far from the city (according to my orientation), there the beatings began, death threats - "Don't you remember what happened to Mikel Zabalza?"- and threats of raping my girlfriend. Later they pretended to be throwing me down a cliff, throwing me up and into their hands, and they put a gun (I guess) to my temple. All this in while being hit, threatened and asphyxiated.

Seeing that I did not give in to their requirements, they took me to another place, always with my head down and in a bag. There, in a kind of chamber-cell, they changed the fabric bag for a plastic one. Then they began what they called the "serious" interrogation, and there I began to notice a change from blows and threats to pure literal torture.

The methods they applied to me were the plastic bag over my head (kneeling or standing), the "bathtub" inside a toilet which did not cause total suffocation, but I informed them of my illness, asthma, then they gave in to give me my medicine, to later continue with the torture session. They pretended to apply the electrodes. They hit me and put pressure with their hands on my testicles and other parts of my body such as the back of my neck and eardrums. They hit me all over the body with a telephone directory and not so subtle punches and kicks on all parts of my body. All this in a context of psychological torture, threats to my loved ones, threats of sodomization, the game of mock statements and false statements in which they wanted to involve me.

And having to hear the screams of pain and cries, both female and male. All of this during the approximately 24 hours I had to spend in Barcelona. Then in Madrid they continued with less intensity and interest because I had already given the "information" and declarations that they intended.

Alcalá-Meco prison

Ferran Ruiz 
I was arrested at 8 o'clock on the 29th of June at home by about 10 people who identified themselves as "Civil Guards", they were wearing civilian clothing, they handcuffed me and searched the house until 8:30 am, which was when they woke up the neighbors who had to serve as witnesses.

Shortly afterwards they made me get dressed and handcuffed me very tightly again with my hands behind my back, with the jacket covering my head. In this way they put me in a car, lying on the floor, face-down, my left knee against my chest between the front and back seats, where one of the agents was staying during the slow journey from Vic to Barcelona (they took turns to have more time to torture me) he put a bag on me, the kind that is used for garbage, on my head. While they were hitting me asking me questions (the car was running), the co-pilot was standing up and pointing a gun at me and tightening the belt of my trousers to such an extent that it broke. From the bounce, the agent repeatedly hit me in the testicles, liver and back, and on one of the occasions he hit the handcuffs so that they would hurt me more. I couldn't breathe, and they were hitting me in the head and squeezing the bag, I was dying...

We arrived in Barcelona and they removed the bag and blindfolded me. They needed two officers to pick me up from the car floor because legs were numb and sore from the beatings (they weren't over yet).

They brought me into a room where they made me sit handcuffed and they let me breathe for a while, and then they came back with the questions and the bag on my head. They hit me with a telephone book on my skull (which still hurts quite a bit), I was hit in all kinds of ways all over my body by, I'd say a dozen "people" or so, who at the same time insulted me and told me that what was I doing with these people, that I wasn't Catalan, that I was French, that the others had said everything, they opened a door so that I could hear the screams that came out of the other rooms, they hit me with the telephone book again, to tied the bag, asking questions again, and again, and again.

They moved the handcuffs to the front of me (at night) and gave me a sandwich that was disgusting, then they put me in a private car on the way to Madrid, this time sitting down, without giving me back my jacket or the thousand pelas [money] I had on me. The driving had some incident; a tire burst in the back right wheel, I thought they were going to make a big deal out of it, but it was not the case, they stopped many times, I was panicking the whole time.

When we got to Madrid I was allowed to lie down for about half an hour and then they made me stand up facing the wall of the cell for many hours, without moving or leaning on anything until the same officers who had arrested me in Vic came back to get me for more interrogations. They tortured me again with the bag and hit me with the books (the directory) while I was standing facing the wall about to fall down with so many questions and no food (we ate once a day, and it was a small sandwich) .

They had a script and they made you learn it hitting you over and over so that you would repeat it during the statement, the hours I slept were few, and before testifying in front of the public defender (to me, it seemed it was the cops) they made me climb up and down a spiral staircase many times with my face covered and an officer twisting my arms with a gun pointed at the back of my head.

With all this and the threat of extending my days at the DGGC [General Direction of the Civil Guard], they can even make you say that you killed Napoleon.

The days I was kidnapped at the DGGC I heard how they were torturing Musté. When they brought the water bucket and the electrodes, they told him to undress and take off his glasses, then I heard that they put his feet inside the bucket, and I recognised Josep by his way of shouting. They wouldn't stop asking him questions, until I heard them (the cops) shouting because Josep had lost consciousness, this happened several times the same night. They had applied electrodes to him!

Ferran Ruiz Martos, Alcalá-Meco prison

David Martínez 
It was more or less 3 in the morning, when I was heading home in my brother's car, suddenly a car, a Golf, comes out driving in the wrong direction, hits the brakes suddenly and I see 5 people getting off. They all have guns in their hands and are pointing at me, even more people come out from behind me, open the door and throw me to the ground with a scratch, they press my head hard with my nose against the asphalt, they handcuff my hands behind my back very tightly.

They cover my head with the jacket I was wearing, they don't stop slapping the back of my neck and punching me in the kidneys. They put me in a car, lying on the back floor with six feet on top of me trampling hard. All this happened in 2 minutes. From the very first moment they were saying all kinds of things to me: "Come on, son of a bitch, you're really going to get it, you bastard, you and your fucking Catalan Countries, independentist pig, separatist".

The journey was short, during which I could hear them saying: "Let's go to the lake, we're going to refresh the memory, he will need it." They took me into a kind of cell, a very small one, me facing the wall and two people were hitting me everywhere until a third one came in and the other two left, this one I saw had a folder in his hand and he said to me "start squealing", I asked him, who are you?, and immediately hit me on the back of the head and shouted: "come on, let's go!". They load me into another car, sitting in the back, with an individual on each side. One starts to say: "Come on, tell me everything, someone has already tattled your name", and I tell him that I don't know what he's talking about and ask him again who are they, meanwhile the other one keeps hitting me on the head the whole ride until they stop the car.

They make me get off the car, put a mask over my eyes and take me to a room, put me facing the wall and take the mask off. There is a shield of the Civil Guard on the wall, they ask me if I like it, I answer no, without thinking, it came out of my heart. A brutal interrogation immediately begins, there are many officers behind me punching me in the kidneys and head. They ask many questions all at the same time and shout a lot, I couldn't answer, suddenly one of them spins me around and another one tells me that why did I turn around and kicks my testicles with his knee. I fall to the ground as a result of the pain, they tell me to get up, I can't and they pick me up, they take my shirt off saying: "now you're going to sing, you child killer!" and electrodes are applied to my back. The first discharge is relatively weak compared to the second, which makes me fall to the ground dizzy; they sprinkle water on my face and head and make me sit in a corner facing the wall. Then they start telling me that my mother had to be admitted to the hospital with a heart attack and that my brother had a nervous breakdown.

They ask me if I have a girlfriend, I tell them that I don't, they say: "So who do you fuck? Àngel Colom [a famous pro-independence/leftist activist]?, don't you know it? He's a fagot, we'll send you some photos of him and his friend to jail". Every now and then they looked at my head, I guess to see if I had a lump. They tell me to tattle everything, that everyone who is taken here does sooner or later, and they open a door so that I can hear the screams of agony from another detainee. They put the mask over my eyes again and immediately put a gun to my nose that I can see under the mask and say: "That's enough. Either you tattle or we let you go and then shoot you". After a long wait they make me sign a paper in which I am informed for the first time that I am being detained by the Civil Guard in Barcelona and of all my rights as such.

Another interrogation begins, I say that I have the right not to answer, they start laughing and beat me, they put a bag over my head and squeeze it until I can't breathe, this three or four times. Then they explain to me everything that they will ask me in front of the public defender and what I will have to answer, about seven or eight times until I memorize it.

Many, many hours had already passed when they told me that we were going to Madrid. They load me in a car and during the whole trip they don't stop punching me. Once in Madrid, I rest for a long time in a cell measuring one and a half meters by three. Before I realized it, they are already back there, a bag on my head and the same procedure as in Barcelona; judging by their voices, it seems to me that the officers are the same ones, they remind me that if I don't make the statement that we had rehearsed so many times in front of the lawyer, I would get the bag again and maybe other procedures. To avoid all this, I make the exact declaration. They take me back to the cell and once again I face the wall, through the little window in the door they check that I don't lie down on a kind of bed that was there. Later, an officer enters the cell and beats me up punching me in the kidneys, in the head and in the testicles while insulting me saying: "You stink of Catalan, take a shower, you pig!". There wasn't a single day that I didn't get beaten.

Every day that I was in Madrid, I was taken before a forensic doctor officer who asked me if I had been abused and I told her that for my own safety I would not answer that question until I was in the National Court, and so I did.

After five days without being able to eat or sleep properly and enduring torture, I was brought before the Mr. judge Baltasar Garzón, where I reported being tortured and denied everything the Civil Guard said about me. Hours later Carabanchel [prison] seemed like Paraside, there I enjoyed the best shower of my life.

Josep Musté 
At two in the morning, more or less, near Olot, three cars stopped my van. The first one was a Civil Guard car and the other two were camouflaged. A dozen armed men came out of them, pointing their guns at me and forcing me to get out of the van by pushing me and without telling me why they were arresting me. They forced me to get in a car, lying on the ground blindfolded, a blindfold that would not remove until they took me to the National Court five days later. In the meantime, they asked me questions, threatened me with death and told me that they would throw me in the Banyoles lake or shoot me in the head on a mountain that they knew.

During the journey to the headquarters in Barcelona, ​​they made me switch cars three times, dragging me on the floor as I was handcuffed and they wouldn't let me get up. While they were asking me questions, they put a plastic bag over my head when they felt like it, to the point that I was almost asphyxiated.

When we arrived at the headquarters, they began to beat me all over the body, especially in the testicles, kidneys and head, with their hands, feet and very heavy books. Meanwhile, they kept asking me questions, from time to time they put a plastic bag over my head until I almost suffocated, and they threatened me and above all they threatened my partner. They made me believe that they had also arrested her, and told me that they would rape her and throw her down an embankment with me, so it would seem like it had been an accident.

When the interrogation was over, they locked me in a cell five paces long by one and a half wide, until they wanted to question me again. On one occasion they threatened me with electric shocks and they made me pass a thread through my previously wet legs, but it was only to intimidate me. In the evening they told me that we were going on a long journey and that I would have a very bad time there if I didn't help them with the declarations. The transfer was in a car, handcuffed and tied up in the back. They didn't let me go to the bathroom neither in Barcelona nor for the whole trip, so this made me have to pee myself while the civil guards laughed and made fun of me.

When I arrived in Madrid everything was the same as in Barcelona, ​​that is to say, hits on the head with a heavy book, hits on all parts of my body and a plastic bag on my head while they interrogated me. Then they took me to a cell and there I received my first sandwich after almost two days without eating anything. The sandwich was very spicy and bad and I hardly ate any of it.

This went on all Tuesday and all Wednesday, making me testify every morning in front of a gentleman who I was told was a lawyer but who never identified himself, only at the time of signing that I had testified. During these statements it was the only moments when they took off my blindfold. Before going there, however, they threatened me so I would say what they wanted me to say. I had no choice if I did not want to get savagely beaten again.

Thursday, together with the day I spent in Barcelona, were the two days when I was beaten the most and the strongest. On Thursday, due to both the physical and mental pressures, I reached a point where I exploded and when I refused to answer what they wanted, they insulted me and told me to go be brave somewhere else, that they would make me stop acting high and mighty. They tied me to some bars, it seemed to me because I was blindfolded, and they took off my shirt, wet my chest and arms and gave me electric shocks in my elbow. Then I was knocked out and they made me sit in a chair while they asked me the same questions as before. When I refused, they wet me again and tied me up and gave me electric shocks again.

It must be said that from the first moment of my arrest I was asked about specific people from the independence movement such as Carles Castellanos, Jaume Oliveres, Ramon Lòpez, Toni Lecha, etc. From the first moment I saw that what they wanted was to strike the pro-independence movement. It must be said that I reported these tortures to the National Court, both to the forensic doctor and the judge. The medical examiner visited me every day, but I did not say anything for fear that he would be another civil guard.

Pep Musté, Alcalá-Meco

Jordi Bardina 
I was arrested at 7 in the morning at my home by members of the Civil Guard; they immediately handcuffed me very tightly and took me to the Manresa headquarters. During the trip, they put a plastic bag over my head and started beating me, telling me that it was up to me whether everything went well or badly. At the time I didn't even know what I was being accused of.

Once we arrived at the Manresa headquarters (always with the bag on my head) the blows continued constantly, especially on the nape of my neck and punches to my head; all of this combined with insults towards me and my partner ("Catalan dog, we're going to fuck your whore girlfriend"); soon after they make me get into a car (always with the bag on my head, which they tighten when they feel like it), with my head down and almost touching the floor, and I was transferred, as I learned hours later, to Barcelona.

Barcelona was without a doubt where I suffered the most brutal tortures. Constant interrogations and always at least by three or four people who were asking me questions all at the same time and shouting. Always with the bag on my head that they were squeezing until I couldn't take it anymore; once they put my head in a sink full of water, to the point of drowning, while laughing and telling me to remember Mikel Zabalza. The blows are constant, especially in the head, chest and stomach; with the blows they split my lip and they slap me again saying that I did it to myself. During the moments when they let me rest, they make me sit in a corner facing the wall; they often hit me saying I've turned around; a little rest and then the process again: blows, insults, death threats...

They tell me that the displeasure my mother had when she learned that her son was a "terrorist killer of children", she had had a nervous breakdown and was very grave, admitted to a hospital. They ask me about my partner; I say that I don't have any and they hit me again and say that they have also arrested her and that "we are all fucking her". I lost track of time, I remember they left me in a very small room, always facing the wall; then they told me I was in Barcelona and that they were moving me to Madrid, where it would be worse.

They put me in a car with my hands cuffed under my legs. It was already dark night. Once in Madrid, they took me to a cell without any light that was 1.5 meters by 3 meters long; it was very dirty and had an unbearable stench.

From time to time they take me out of the cell and put back the bag on my head; the interrogations start again, now despite the fact that they shout a lot and make me constantly repeat what they say, there are only sporadic blows and I am without the bag on my head for very long periods of time.

I have no idea how many hours or days pass, but suddenly I am taken to testify in front of an instructor; they tell me that the girl who is present there is a lawyer, although she did not have any accreditation nor was I able to speak to her. Right there I reported abuse and all I got was a beating when I returned to the cell, punches, kicks...while they told me that now I would know what torture was.

They grab me and take me to a car; the beatings are constant, they tighten the bag and tell me that they are taking me to the Retiro to make me soak, "Let's see if you're so brave and report torture again, son of a bitch" they said to me; finally they leave me in an other cell, now with a powerful light that they won't turn off at any moment.

Finally, after five days without hardly having slept, shattered both physically and morally, and only wanting to be able to rest, I declare before the Illustrious Mr. Magistrate Baltasar Garzón.

Jordi Bardina, Alcalá-Meco prison

Eduard Pomar 
Monday, July 6th. After 9 o'clock in the evening, I leave the house to go to have dinner; when I'm in the street I'm approached by three men who identify themselves as agents of the Civil Guard. They are in plainclothes. They tell me I'm under arrest, search my car and take me to the Civil Guard barracks in Mira-sol (Sant Cugat). I ask them to make a phone call to notify my family and they tell me that I am incommunicado and that I am being accused of collaboration with Terra Lliure. They handcuff me and take me by car to Manresa; before arriving, however, they cover my face with the jacket I'm wearing.

Once inside the Manresa barracks, they locked me in a cell that was no more than 2 meters long and 1 wide; the mattress there is burnt and the bedclothes very dirty. It doesn't take long when they bring us out. They cover my head and take me to an office where there is a doctor; he asks me some questions about the diseases that I have had and a small medical examination; then they take me back to the cell where I spend the night. The next day, around 8 o'clock in the morning, they let me out of the cell and take me to see the doctor. I can go to the bathroom and then they bring me a latte and a pastry for breakfast (I hadn't had anything since noon on Monday). When I'm done they handcuff me and cover my head with the jacket.

They escort me out of the building and put me in a car. Later, three people get on the car who I identify by their voices as the ones that had arrested me and taken me to Manresa. When we're far from the barracks they take my jacket off and tell me to behave well and they'll behave with me. I have one arm handcuffed to the car door. From the comments made by the civil guards I learn that they are taking me to Madrid. At one of the stops they make to fill up with gas, I can see that Ramon Piqué is also arrested in another car. Neither car has Civil Guard badges. It is 3 o'clock in the afternoon on Tuesday when we arrive in Madrid. When we are getting near the General Directorate of the Civil Guard, they cover my head again. Once inside, they take me to a cell and yell at me to start doing push-ups. After a while they stop me and tell me to stand still staring at the wall. (The cell is bigger than the one in Manresa and is in better conditions; the mattress and mattress pad look new and the floor is quite clean).

After about an hour, 2 men enter the cell; one of them puts a black plastic bag over my head and grabs me by the back of the head with his hand, squeezing it hard. They take me into a room and push me against the wall; one of the two men stands beside me; the other, further away, tells me that I must already know why they brought me here and that I should start talking; then the one next to me starts hitting me on the back with his outstretched arm to "refresh my memory", as he says; judging by his strength, he looks like a corpulent person; he also kicks me in the chest and the back of my legs. The blows are constant and when I lose my position he yells at me to stand up straight.

Then they start to tighten the bag on my head and I feel a strong feeling of suffocation. Breathing becomes interrupted and the heart beats rapidly; when I think I'm about to suffocate, they open the bag a little so I can breathe, but they immediately close it again. This operation is repeated several times during the interrogation, interspersed with indiscriminate blows all over the body. The feeling of fear and helplessness cannot be explained in words and is not comparable to what I could have felt before. Finally, this first interrogation ends, the duration of which I cannot specify exactly, but it could be close to an hour.

They return me to the cell. After a while they let me out again and take me to a room; before entering, however, they tell me to open my eyes and take a relaxed position. Only I enter the room. Inside, a woman tells me that she is the medical examiner (she shows me a credential); He asks me how I am and if I have been interrogated; I tell her yes; then she asks me what the interrogation was like; I tell her everything they have done to me and she scribbles on a piece of paper. She tells me to try to "cheer up" and to see if they give me dinner. When I leave, the officers who take me want to know what I told the doctor.

When I'm in the cell they bring me "dinner". I am dizzy and have a headache; this makes it hard for me to eat. When I've finished dinner, they make me sit up straight with my arms next to my body and without being allowed to move. In this position I find myself at the bottom of the cell, waiting for them to come to me at any moment to interrogate me again, when I hear the sound of water running continuously as if there was an open faucet and I panic at the thought that they will out me through "the bathtub".

After a while I hear them open the door; they shout at me to keep still, they put the bag back on my head and pull me out of the cell. The second interrogation begins. This one is similar to the previous one, although there are some differences: blows to my arms and legs are also accompanied by blows to my genitals and my head; the latter are carried out with a telephone directory; they also slap my ears with their open hands while they keep insulting me. During the interrogation they take some cables with their hands and tell me that they are connected to a truck battery and that if I don't say what they want they will connect it to the current. Luckily, they ultimately don't. At another point in the interrogation, they start to untie my trousers and threaten to "fuck my ass" while making fun of me, although he they didn't do it.

When I've been being questioned for quite some time, I hear someone enter the room. The officer next to me gives me two or three hard blows and I hear him walk away; the other tells me: "you're lucky, you're saved by the bell". The officers change turns. The one who entered the room asks me some questions regarding what I had previously stated to the other officers, but I don't get hit again until the end of the interrogation. I go back to the cell. For the first time since I arrived, they let me lie on the bed. I'm very tired and my whole body aches. Suddenly they turn on the light and shout for me to stand up. Time passes. Finally two officers come in the cell; they ask me if I want to "manifest" (declare); that if I do that they will take my statement in front of the lawyer and then take me to the National Court to testify in front of the judge. I say that I do; I can't believe that this ordeal can end. I can only think of getting out of there. The next day, Wednesday, they take me back to see the medical examiner. After that they interrogate me again, this time without violence to ratify the statements I had made the day before.

Later I am taken to "testify" before the official lawyer; he doesn't ask any questions to me nor the Civil Guard officer who is reading my statement aloud. This officer is the one who led the two interrogations in which I suffered abuse and torture. Now I could see his face well. Finally the lawyer limited himself to signing the statement.

In the afternoon they take me, along with other detainees, to the National Court. After spending a few hours alone in a cell, in the evening I testify before the judge who decrees my release on bail. Despite this, I was taken, along with two other detainees, to the Carabanchel Prison since the bail could not be paid until the next day. On Thursday afternoon I leave free and this nightmare that has lasted for three long days finally ends.

Eduard Pomar, Sant Cugat, 30-8-1992

Ramon Piqué 
Monday July 6th, around 8pm I go to the MDT premises (Carrer Sant Pere més Baix) in order to find out how the arrests of pro-independence activists that took place the previous week went. The day before I arrived from the Canary Islands where I was working on a Computer Assisted Language Teaching Seminar organized by the EUTI of the UAB and the EUTI of the University of Las Palmas.

There I find out that the detainees have suffered torture: the bag, the bathtub, electrodes, punches... I make a list of the people arrested as well as the date, dedication and the lawyer they have been assigned. It is information that I want to use for the preparation of the "CLAM" magazine, the magazine of the Committees of Solidarity with the Catalan Patriots, a magazine that can easily be found on the street.

Around 10:45 at night I leave headquarters together with other comrades. After leaving two in Barcelona, the one driving the car accompanies me to Montcada i Reixac, to my parents' house. He drops me off about 300 meters from home. In front of home I see then, behind a phone booth, two people.

When I go up to my parents' house, my mother tells me that there has been a car in front of the house all day and a boy has asked for me twice, saying that he is a workmate. She also received a phone call to the same effect. My mother has taken the car's license plate and told my sister about it on the phone. After a while they changed cars. I haven't lived in that house for over ten years.

It hasn't been ten minutes since that moment when they're knocking on the door asking to see me; it's the civil guard, in plainclothes, who has an arrest warrant for me. There are three of them, and one of them quickly grabs me and pushes me towards the street. I quickly ask them to let me take the case of the contact lenses and glasses; they tell me to also take the identification documents and not to touch anything else.

Shortly after, once handcuffed and in the car (which is not labeled as a police car) they take me to Manresa, where I spend the night tied up, with a chain made of handcuffs, to a heating pipe. The next day they take me, along with the Eduard Pomar (I learned this later), also in a car without a badge at the General Directorate of the Civil Guard, in Madrid.

They cover my head with my jacket to enter and take me to a cell, one and a half by three meters and about two and a half high. Minutes later, an officer through the window tells me to start doing push-ups, first lying down, then standing up. I stay like that for a while until they open the door, blindfold me and take me to another room. In this room, they cover my head with a plastic bag, a bag that they keep tightening, as I'm on my knees, eventually causing a strong feeling of suffocation. They perform this operation several times while reminding me that a person can hold up to five minutes without breathing.

I think there are about three people doing the interrogation, but I can only identify the voices. They tell me to raise my hand if I have something new to say. I have nothing to say, but the feeling of suffocation and the panic that surrounds me makes me raise my hand continuously, yet they still ask me if it's really something new. My helplessness is absolute and my fear grows bigger and bigger. Immediately, and without removing the bag from my head, two or three people start hitting me at the same time. They say that I will end up talking. The blows are aimed at the stomach, the testicles, the chest, the arms... and then they take a list of telephone numbers and while they remind me by shouting that there are thousands of phone numbers and addreces, they hit me in the head until I fall down to the floor. The punches leave a scar on my left eye. I don't know how much time has passed since they took me to the cell, before, however, they remind me that they have three days and that they take turns, and that they have no problem asking for an extension of my solitary confinement up to five days.

Before entering the cell they tell me to wash my face and hands. That's when I notice my left eye is inflamed. The officer who accompanied me also sees it and starts asking me what did I do to my eye. Obviously I answer that I don't know but that I probably did it myself. In the cell, they let me lie on a mattress, Pikolin brand still with the plastic, which has a blood stain, I guess from a previous detainee. The wall also has a large blood stain in a shape similar to a handprint.

It hasn't been long, maybe about fifteen minutes, when an officer tells me through the window to do push-ups again and to count them out loud so he can hear it. I think I did about 125. The agent wants me to do them well: bend the albows all the way down and come up with my body straight and without falling asleep. Sport has never been a hobby for me. My legs can't hold me anymore when they let me lie down for a while until they come to get me and take me, always with my eyes covered and my head down, to an office where the forensic doctor is.

She asks me how am I. I answer that she can already see it herself. She looked more scared than me. She asks me about my left eye, and after I explain it to her, I beg her not to include it in the report because they had told me to be careful with what I told the coroner because later they would ask the doctor. I tell her that I haven't slept or eaten since the night before, except for a sandwich given to me by those who took me to Madrid. After the doctor's visit, they give me dinner. However, I can't eat much, it's hard for me to open my mouth and I'm only thirsty, very thirsty for water.

After dinner they make me stand up against the back wall of the cell, the wall with the blood stain. I will stay like this for the rest of the day, all night and the next morning. I knew that one of the previous detainees had been made to stay like this for three days. At that moment I can't believe that I'm capable of resisting even one more night. An officer watches over the window to check that I don't get in any "comfortable" positions, I have to remain upright with my arms down, neither in front nor behind. I think I stayed like this for about 18 hours, with only one interruption, during the night, when the second interrogation took place.

The second interrogation is carried out by the night shift, I have the impression that these ones shouted louder than the other ones, I guess because they came fresh. Just as they were entering the cell and while they were blindfolding me, they shouted at me that now I would speak. Also now they use the bag method again, although without making me get down on my knees, and every now and then they make me do push-ups. Since I can no longer do them properly due to lack of strength and the pain in my leg muscles, they "help" me by pressing hard and abruptly on me when I go down. The pain is very strong and I can't take it anymore. They also combine the bag with punches, although now not so abundantly or indiscriminately, perhaps so as not to leave a mark like the one in the left eye again. They were also hitting me with both hands at the same time on the sides of the head, in a way that makes the ears hurts for a whole day.

The notion of time is a little confusing to me, among other things because they turn the light in the cell on and off when they feel like it. There is also an officer who entertains himself by continuously turning on and off the light switch. The only thing that lets me know if it's a new day or not is the sound of footsteps on the roof, which I think is the barracks' patio.

After these interrogations I remain standing up in the cell, only during dinner they allow me to sit for a while.

When I see the coroner again, after lunch, I explain to her that I spent the night and part of the day awake and without sleep, again I ask her not to write it in the report. Then again I ask her not to write it in the report. Then they let me lie on the bed, where I lie until they come to fetch me for another interrogation. This time it's not as harsh as the previous ones, I get the bag less times than before and the number of hits is no more than a dozen: I guess I've already memorized the statement since I've repeated it so many times. From this room I hear the screams of some of my comrades that are being tortured at the moment, and they open the door so that I can hear better while they tell me that everyone ends up talking. They show me the list of prisoners that I had written in Barcelona at the MDT location, as well as a sheet of mine where I had written that two of the previous detainees had suffered the bag and bathtub torture methods.

Then they let me lie back on the bed and I feel really lucky because I really want to rest. A new life begins for me in that hell because they will not touch me again until the statement in front of the judge. That night I can rest for the first time in three days, however I am often woken up by the shouts of the officers when they come to look for a comrade, the fear that they will come for me again does not let me sleep for a long time.

The next day after making a mock statement I went to the instructor and the public defender to make the statement in front of the civil guard. The lawyer, a lady about 55-60 years old, gives me an orange candy while making comments about the shifts she has to work that weekend. I can't believe that lady's indifference. I make the statement as I had learned it.

I believed that that day they would take me to the Court to testify, and that gave me encouragement because it meant that there would probably be no more torture. This state was suddenly turned upside down when an officer brought a paper granting an extension of two days of my incommunicado. I could not believe that I had to be there for two more days, this caused me great anxiety. The officer told me that this document was in case I did not ratify my incriminating statement before the judge, in which case I would go back down to the cell and the interrogations would begin again.

The next day, Friday, I was taken to the Court. In the Court's cell, I hadn't made up my mind about what to say, whether to testify or not to testify, I was afraid until the last moment. There was no way I wanted to go back down there. I knew that after testifying in front of the judge, one can go to prison (where I was sure they would take me), or be let free, but hardly return to the hands of the civil guard. The terror, however, that I felt just thinking that it could be true was more powerful at first since I ratified part of the statement, then the denunciation of the torture quickly swept me away.

When the judge decreed my release on bail I couldn't believe it and while I was in the cell again waiting for my release I really wanted to cry. When I saw my brother I couldn't hold it and I cried a lot. I guess it was because I didn't have to go back down there.

Ramon Piqué, Montcada i Reixac, July 13th, 1992

References

Catalan nationalists